Island Lake, Ontario may refer to:

Island Lake, Algoma District
Island Lake, Sudbury District